Terralink International was a New Zealand owned and operated provider of geographic information systems (GIS) and mapping solutions. In 2014 it was bought by Property IQ, and has now become CoreLogic NZ Limited; 60% owned by the US-based CoreLogic corporation.

Overview 

Terralink International specialises in delivering mapping, property information and imagery, as well as geographical and spatial information. Terralink also produces and updates many of New Zealand's official topographic, city and scientific maps.
Other geospatial related services and solutions provided by Terralink International include:
 GIS/Spatial data maintenance, production and analysis
 Photogrammetry
 Cartography
 Imagery acquisition, provision and hosting
 Data replication and integration
 GIS infrastructure development
 Addressing Services/Matching
 Geocoding
 Online hosting
 Web and software development
 Customer Support Services
 Data analytics

History 
A former Government-owned enterprise with a history extending back over 100 years, Terralink International maintains and manages New Zealand’s largest and most comprehensive land and property information database.
Terralink NZ Limited was privatised in June 2001 when it was purchased by a consortium of investors to form Terralink International Limited. This occurred following a receivership in January 2001, after which its ownership was 80% Animation Research Holdings Ltd, a New Zealand company specialising in 3D animation, and 20% Spatial Holdings Ltd.

In 2014 it was bought by Property IQ, and has now become CoreLogic NZ Limited; 60% owned by the US-based CoreLogic corporation.
Property information firms mergeTerralink International is 100% New Zealand owned and operated.

Location 
Terralink International's head office and core production facility is situated in Wellington with a satellite office in Auckland. Currently around 75 staff are employed by Terralink International.

References

External links
 Terralink International's corporate website

Geographic information systems
Information technology companies of New Zealand